The Channel Island Snooker Championship (also known as the Channel Island Snooker Final) is a two-player snooker match held almost every April between the current island snooker champion of Jersey and the current island snooker champion of Guernsey. The trophy was originally sponsored by the main newspapers of the respective islands, the Guernsey Evening Press and the Jersey Evening Post. The match takes place in each island in alternate years and consists of the best of 7 frames. Gary Britton is the defending champion, representing Jersey is the current champion, having defeated Adam Shorto in the 2019 final.

List of Channel Island Champions
Below is a list of previous champions. The match takes place in Jersey during even-numbered years and in Guernsey during odd-numbered years.

References

External links 
  Homepage of the Jersey Billiards and Snooker Association
  Homepage of the Guernsey Billiards and Snooker Association

Snooker competitions in the United Kingdom
Snooker amateur competitions
Recurring sporting events established in 1932
1932 establishments in the United Kingdom
1932 establishments in Guernsey